The Brothers is a British film melodrama of 1947, starring Patricia Roc, Will Fyffe and Maxwell Reed, from a novel of the same name by L. A. G. Strong.

Plot
In the Western Isles of Scotland, a long and murderous grudge exists between two clans, the Macraes and McFarishes. The arrival of a serving girl (Patricia Roc) to work for the Macraes reinflames the conflict and causes an internal power-struggle between two brothers in the Macrae clan (played by Maxwell Reed and Duncan Macrae).

Cast
 Patricia Roc as Mary 
 Will Fyffe as Aeneas McGrath 
 Maxwell Reed as Fergus Macrae 
 Finlay Currie as Hector Macrae 
 John Laurie as Dugald McLeod and Alistair MacDonald 
 Andrew Crawford as Willie McFarish 
 Duncan Macrae as John Macrae 
 Morland Graham as Angus McFarish 
 Megs Jenkins as Angustina McFarish 
 James Woodburn as Priest 
 David McAlister as George McFarish 
 Patrick Boxill as The Informer 
 David Keir as Postman

Production

Development
L.A.G. Strong's novel was published in 1932. Strong was a friend of David MacDonald and in 1936 they agreed to make a film of the novel together. Plans were delayed until after the war, during which time MacDonald established himself as a leading documentarian. MacDonald took the project to Sydney Box who was enthusiastic about making it.

Box wanted Ann Todd, star of The Seventh Veil, to play the lead, as the second part of the two-picture million dollar contract she signed in the wake of the success of The Seventh Veil. Daybreak was to be the first and in March 1946 Box said he hoped to star Todd in The Brothers after that film.

Box wanted Emlyn Williams to play John and Michael Redgrave to play Fergus. Emlyn Williams dropped out and was replaced by Eric Portman. Portman refused to make a film with Todd and was replaced by Duncan Macrae. Redgrave dropped out to make Fame is the Spur and was replaced by Maxwell Reed. Todd did not want to work with Reed as she had not enjoyed working with him on Daybreak Patricia Roc played the role instead. Roc was reluctant to take a role refused by Todd but eventually agreed. Her fee was £5,000. (Roc had reportedly been kicked off Diggers Republic – which became Diamond City – because of her involvement in a divorce scandal. She made the film after shooting Canyon Passage in Hollywood.)

MacDonald knew the film would be troublesome censorwise because of the material. "We hope to get by in the French way", said MacDonald. "Rape, murder and nature, that's about all."

Filming
The unit moved to the Isle of Skye in July 1947.
Roc ended up enjoying working on the film and said the role was her favourite, in part because of an eight-week location shoot on the Isle of Skye. Studio work took place at Shepherds Bush in September 1946.

US Version
The film encountered censorship challenges for its release in the US, in part because of its depiction of illicit whisky manufacturing. However Sydney Box managed to get the film passed by the US censors by adding some shots where detectives arrived on the island to break the operation, and filming an ending where the hero and heroine – the "good" characters – survived instead of being murdered.

There were three main changes:
removal of a seduction scene on a beach
changing the original tragic ending (Patricia Roc is killed by her lover) to a happier one (she survives)
addition of a scene where John Laurie admits the collective guilt of the fisherman in the death of a man
Duncan Macrae is no longer executed by fishermen - it is implied he will be punished legally

Critical reception
Variety described The Brothers as: "Starkly uncompromising... No attempt has been made to win favor of those who cannot stomach a grim story, and even the contemplated happy ending (not in the book) has been discarded in favor of one more logical, It will not be everybody's entertainment, and will do best with discriminating au-diences here and in the U. S. Drawing cards are a fine cast, good story, grand direction and splendid camera work and music score. Patricia Roc contributes her best performance to date, and newcomer Maxwell Reed, establishes himself in a part that would have been a natural for James Mason."
 
The New York Times wrote, "Patricia Roc is lovely in form and grace, but her hair-dos, her dresses and her expressions smack more of Elstree than of the Hebrides".

Box-office
The film incurred an estimated loss of £55,700.

Modern reputation
The film's reputation has risen in recent years. An article in The Scotsman praised the film saying:
There is sex, there is violence, there is nudity and there is one of the most shocking killings ever portrayed in a mainstream movie. An informer, who has reported illicit whisky trafficking, is bound hand and foot, with cork floats under his armpits and a fish tied to his cap. He is then sent bobbing out to sea, to await a passing seabird that will spot the fish and dive hundreds of feet to pierce fish, cap and skull in a single fatal movement....The Brothers is... the skeleton in the cupboard no-one talks about. It bears more resemblance to a Quentin Tarantino film than one by Powell and Pressburger.
Producer Christopher Young said "It's slightly bizarre, some very good performances, fantastic cinematography, but quite a strange script, really quite dark."

David Parkinson, a reviewer for the Radio Times, wrote: "while Stephen Dade's images of Skye are highly evocative, precious little passion is generated by orphaned Patricia Roc and Andrew Crawford, even though she's the housekeeper of his deadliest rival (Finlay Currie). Part of the problem is the straightlaced nature of postwar British cinema, which kept emotions firmly in check.;TV Guide called the film a "fair effort with technical talent outweighing the performers"; but Eye for Film found the film "startlingly bold and suggestive for its time...surprisingly gripping."

External links

The Brothers at BFI
 
The Brothers at Letterbox DVD
Review of film at Variety
Review of film at New York Times

References

1947 films
1947 drama films
British drama films
British black-and-white films
Films directed by David MacDonald (director)
Films with screenplays by Muriel Box
Films with screenplays by Sydney Box
Films produced by Sydney Box
Films shot at Lime Grove Studios
Films set in Scotland
Melodrama films
1940s British films
1940s English-language films